Watford City Air Force Station is a joint United States Air Force and Federal Aviation Administration installation located about 40 km southwest of Watford City, North Dakota.  It is the site of an ARSR-4 radar system, which provides air traffic surveillance along the US-Canada border, as well as limited weather radar data.

History
Established as United States Air Force gap-filler station TM-177B (47°40′43″N 103°46′50″W) with an unmanned Bendix AN/FPS-18 Radar providing data through Dickinson Air Force Station/706th Aircraft Control and Warning (later Radar) Squadron (Minot AFS/786RS after Dickinson closed in 1965), the current facility was activated  as a Joint Surveillance System facility with an Air Route Surveillance Radar.

References

External links
 National Weather Service - Watford City ARSR-4 Radar
 786th AC&W Squadron at Minot Air Force Station

Installations of the United States Air Force in North Dakota
Radar stations of the United States Air Force
Federal Aviation Administration
Buildings and structures in McKenzie County, North Dakota
Semi-Automatic Ground Environment sites
1979 establishments in North Dakota